This is a list of law enforcement agencies in the state of Arizona.

According to the US Bureau of Justice Statistics' 2008 Census of State and Local Law Enforcement Agencies, the state had 141 law enforcement agencies employing 14,591 sworn police officers, about 224 for each 100,000 residents.

State agencies 
 Arizona Counter Terrorism Information Center
 Arizona Department of Corrections (ADC)
 Arizona Department of Economic Security
Office of Special Investigations 
 Arizona Division of Emergency Management
 Arizona Department of Revenue Criminal Investigations Unit
 Arizona Department of Homeland Security 
 Arizona Department of Transportation (ADOT)
 Enforcement and Compliance Division (ECD)
 Arizona Department of Public Safety (DPS)
 Arizona State Capitol Police 
 Arizona Highway Patrol  (DPS)
 Arizona Rangers 
 Agency Support Division
 Criminal Investigations Division (CID)
 Technical Services Division (TSD)
 Arizona Commercial Vehicle Enforcement 
 Arizona Game and Fish Department
 Arizona State Park Ranger Police
Arizona Office of Inspector General (OIG)
Arizona Counter Assault Team (CAT)
Arizona HEAT Unit (High Speed Unit) (HEAT)
Arizona Motor Unit (High Speed Unit) (Motor)
Arizona Department of Wildlife Rangers (Wildlife)

Regional agencies 
Arizona Gang Task Force
East Valley DUI Task Force
Southern Arizona DUI Task Force
Southeast Arizona Task Force

County agencies 

Apache County Sheriff's Office
Cochise County Sheriff's Office
Coconino County Sheriff's Office
Gila County Sheriff's Office
Graham County Sheriff's Office
Greenlee County Sheriff's Office

La Paz County Sheriff's Office
Maricopa County Sheriff's Office
Mohave County Sheriff's Office
Navajo County Sheriff's Office
Pima County Sheriff's Department
Pinal County Sheriff's Office

Santa Cruz County Sheriff's Office
Yavapai County Sheriff's Office
Yuma County Sheriff's Office

Municipal agencies 

Apache Junction Police Department
Avondale Police Department
Benson Police Department
Bisbee Police Department
Buckeye Police Department
Bullhead City Police Department
Camp Verde Marshal's Office
Casa Grande Police Department
Chandler Police Department
Chino Valley Police Department
Clarkdale Police Department
Clifton Police Department
Coolidge Police Department
Cottonwood Police Department
Douglas Police Department
Eagar Police Department
El Mirage Police Department
Eloy Police Department
Flagstaff Police Department
Florence Police Department
Fredonia Marshal's Office
Gilbert Police Department
Glendale Police Department
Globe Police Department
Goodyear Police Department
Hayden Police Department

Holbrook Police Department
Huachuca City Police Department
Jerome Police Department
Kearny Police Department
Kingman Police Department
Lake Havasu City Police Department
Mammoth Police Department
Marana Police Department
Maricopa Police Department
Mesa Police Department
Miami Police Department
Nogales Police Department
Oro Valley Police Department
Page Police Department
Paradise Valley Police Department
Parker Police Department
Patagonia Marshal's Office
Payson Police Department
Peoria Police Department
Phoenix Police Department
Pima Police Department
Pinetop-Lakeside Police Department
Prescott Police Department
Prescott Valley Police Department
Quartzsite Police Department
Safford Police Department

Sahuarita Police Department
San Luis Police Department
Scottsdale Police Department
Sedona Police Department
Show Low Police Department
Sierra Vista Police Department
Snowflake-Taylor Police Department
Somerton Police Department
South Tucson Police Department
Springerville Police Department
St. Johns Police Department
Superior Police Department
Surprise Police Department
Tempe Police Department
Thatcher Police Department
Tolleson Police Department
Tombstone Marshal's Office
Tucson Police Department
Wellton Police Department
Wickenburg Police Department
Willcox Police Department
Williams Police Department
Winslow Police Department
Youngstown Police Department
Yuma Police Department

School/College agencies 

Arizona State University Police Department
Arizona Western College Police
Central Arizona College Police Department
Chinle School District Police
Eastern Arizona College Police Department
Grand Canyon University Police Department

Maricopa Community Colleges Police Department
Northern Arizona University Police Department
Pima Community College Police Department
Tuba City School District Security
University of Arizona Police Department
Yavapai College Police Department

Tribal agencies 

Ak-Chin Police Department
Fort McDowell Yavapai Police Department
Gila River Police Department
Hopi Police Department
Hualapai Nation Police Department
Keams Canyon Police Department
 Navajo Nation Police Department
Pascua Yaqui Police Department
Salt River Police Department
San Carlos Apache Police Department
Tonto Apache Police Department
White Mountain Apache Police Department
Yavapai-Prescott Tribal Police

Federal agencies
 Hoover Dam Police Department
 National Park Service
National Park Service Rangers
 Bureau of Indian Affairs, Office Justice Services Police
 United States Forest Service
 Office of the United States Marshal for the District of Arizona
 U.S. Customs and Border Protection
 U.S. Immigration and Customs Enforcement
 United States Department of Veterans Affairs Police

References

Arizona
Law enforcement agencies of Arizona
Law enforcement